Squalius orientalis is a species of freshwater fish in the family Cyprinidae.  It is endemic to Turkey.

References

Squalius
Fish described in 1847